Stenoglene hilaris is a moth in the family Eupterotidae. It was described by Felder in 1874. It is found in Mozambique and South Africa.

Adults are uniform mouse-colour, with the forewings a shade darker than the hindwings, the former crossed by two curved lines, the first nearest the base very indistinct, the second broken into spots.

References

Moths described in 1874
Janinae
Moths of Sub-Saharan Africa